Henriëtte Geertruida Knip (19 July 1783 – 29 May 1842) was a flower painter from the Northern Netherlands.

Knip was born in Tilburg as the daughter of the painter Nicolaas Frederik Knip. After her father went blind, she followed lessons from her older brother, Joseph August Knip. In 1802, she followed him to Paris and took lessons from the flower painter Gerard van Spaendonck. She became a successful painter and spent summers in Haarlem painting the flowers of the various flower companies, and she spent winters in Amsterdam teaching ladies how to paint.

In 1824 she went back again to Paris to take lessons from the artist Jan Frans van Dael. When her brother began to go blind, she was able to support his family as well as herself. She never married and died in Haarlem. Her work is sometimes confused with that of her niece Henriëtte Ronner-Knip, whose works generally contain animals.

References

External links 

 Henriëtte Knip in the RKD
 Henriëtte Knip in 1001 Vrouwen uit de Nederlandse geschiedenis
 

1783 births
1842 deaths
People from Tilburg
18th-century Dutch painters
19th-century Dutch painters
Flower artists
Dutch women painters
19th-century Dutch women artists
18th-century Dutch women artists